Laurel Hill Furnace is a historic iron furnace located at St. Clair Township, Westmoreland County, Pennsylvania. It was built in 1845, and is a rectangular cut stone furnace with four arches at its base.  It remained in blast until 1855–1860.  The furnace was donated to the Western Pennsylvania Conservancy in 1973.

It was added to the National Register of Historic Places in 1975.

References

External links
oldindustry.org website

Industrial buildings and structures on the National Register of Historic Places in Pennsylvania
Historic American Engineering Record in Pennsylvania
Industrial buildings completed in 1845
Buildings and structures in Westmoreland County, Pennsylvania
National Register of Historic Places in Westmoreland County, Pennsylvania